Hashgraph is a distributed ledger technology that has been described as an alternative to blockchains. The hashgraph technology is currently patented, is used by the public ledger  Hedera, and there is a grant to implement the patent as a result of the Apache 2.0's Grant of Patent License (provision #3) so long as the implementation conforms to the terms of the Apache license.  The native cryptocurrency of the Hedera Hashgraph system is HBAR.

Unlike blockchains, hashgraphs do not bundle data into blocks or use miners to validate transactions. Instead, hashgraphs use a "gossip about gossip" protocol where the individual nodes on the network "gossip" about transactions to create directed acyclic graphs that time-sequence transactions. Each "gossip" message contains one or more transactions plus a timestamp, a digital signature, and cryptographic hashes of two earlier events. This makes Hashgraph form an asynchronous Byzantine Fault-Tolerant (aBFT) consensus algorithm.

Hashgraph was invented in the mid-2010s by the American computer scientist Leemon Baird. Baird is the co-founder and chief technical officer of Swirlds, a company that holds patents covering the hashgraph algorithm.

Concept 
Hashgraph has been described as a continuation or successor to the blockchain concept, which provides increased speed, fairness, low cost, and security constraints. The Hedera white paper co-authored by Baird explained that "at the end of each round, each node calculates the shared state after processing all transactions that were received in that round and before," and it "digitally signs a hash of that shared state, puts it in a transaction, and gossips it out to the community."

Hedera Hashgraph 
Hedera Hashgraph is the only public distributed ledger based on the Hashgraph algorithm. Hedera Hashgraph is developed by a company of the same name, Hedera, based in Dallas, Texas. Hedera was founded by Hashgraph inventor Leemon Baird and his business partner Mance Harmon, and previously had an exclusive license to the Hashgraph patents held by their company, Swirlds. The Hedera Governing Council voted to purchase the patent rights to Hashgraph and make the algorithm open source under the Apache License in 2022.

Hedera is owned and managed by a "governing council" of global companies and entities. The council's members include Swirlds, as well as Google, Boeing, IBM, Deutsche Telekom, LG, Tata Communications, Électricité de France, FIS,  University College London, the London School of Economics, DLA Piper, Shinhan Bank, Standard Bank, ServiceNow, Ubisoft, Abrdn, DBS Bank, Dell, and several others.

Criticism
It has been claimed that hashgraphs are less technically constrained than blockchains proper.  Cornell Professor Emin Gün Sirer notes that "The correctness of the entire Hashgraph protocol seems to hinge on every participant knowing and agreeing upon N, the total number of participants in the system," which is "a difficult number to determine in an open distributed system." Baird responded that "All of the nodes at a given time know how many nodes there are." A hashgraph developer at the time noted that "...a node joining the network is a transaction like any other - it gets assigned a consensus timestamp, after which point all nodes now include it in consensus."

References

Distributed computing
Cryptography